Mont Albert railway station was located on the Lilydale and Belgrave lines in Victoria, Australia between Box Hill and Union stations. It served the eastern Melbourne suburb of Mont Albert. It opened on 11 August 1890 and closed on 17 February 2023 due to project works of the Level Crossing Removal Project.

History
Mont Albert station opened on 11 August 1890 and, like the suburb itself, was named after Prince Albert, the consort of Queen Victoria.

In 1963, boom barriers replaced hand gates at the Mont Albert Road level crossing, located nearby in the Flinders Street (Up) direction of the station.

In the 1960s, track amplification works resulted in the Box Hill bound platform being rebuilt and converted to an island platform. In December 1971, services on the third track from East Camberwell were extended though the station to Box Hill.

In 2020, it was announced that the level crossings at Union and Mont Albert Roads would be fast-tracked for removal by 2023. The project will involve the closure of both Mont Albert and nearby Surrey Hills station, with a brand new Union station to be constructed between the two stations and is expected to open in May 2023. The current station buildings will be refurbished and relocated within the precinct for community use.

On 17 February 2023, the last train to depart from Mont Albert was Belgrave bound train at 8:37pm. The station is now permanently closed alongside Surrey Hills station. The brand new Union station is expected to be opened by May 2023.

Platforms and services
Mont Albert had one island platform (Platforms 2 and 3) and one side platform (Platform 1), linked by an underpass. It was serviced by Metro Trains' Lilydale and Belgrave line services.

Platform 1:
  all stations and limited express services to Flinders Street
  all stations and limited express services to Flinders Street

Platform 2:
  all stations services to Lilydale
  all stations services to Belgrave

Platform 3:
  weekday all stations services to Blackburn, Ringwood and Lilydale
  weekday all stations services to Blackburn, Ringwood and Belgrave

Transport links
Ventura Bus Lines operated one route via Mont Albert station, under contract to Public Transport Victoria:
 : Box Hill Central - Burwood

Gallery

References

External links
 Melway map at street-directory.com.au

Railway stations in Melbourne
Railway stations in Australia opened in 1890
Railway stations closed in 2023
Disused railway stations in Melbourne
2023 disestablishments in Australia